Sara Mohanpur (also called Sara Mohammad) is a village in Darbhanga District of Bihar, located 4 km from the Darbhanga Railway Station and 9.3 km from the Darbhanga Airport.

Saramohanpur is the sign of unity between different people belonging to different castes.

Sara Mohanpur is also famous for the palatial Mohanpur House and the garden/orchard surrounding it. Mohanpur House belonged to the (Late) Mukund Jha, who donated it in 1972 to the Government of Bihar for establishing an Ayurvedic College.

Initially, the Mohanpur House served as the head office of the L N Mithila University from 1972 to 1975. Thereafter Maharani "Rameshwari Bhartiya Chikitsa Vigyan Sansthan" was established and functions at this house. It was named after the wife of Maharaja Rameshwar Singh, the second last Maharaja of Darbhanga.

This institute is affiliated to Kameshwar Singh Darbhanga Sanskrit University and offers the BAMS degree.

References 

Villages in Darbhanga district